Rhytida oconnori is a species of medium-sized, air-breathing land snail, a terrestrial pulmonate gastropod mollusc in the family Rhytididae. It is found only at the top of New Zealand's South Island in the Abel Tasman National Park and at Parapara Peak in Golden Bay.

References

Endemic fauna of New Zealand
Gastropods of New Zealand
Gastropods described in 1946
Rhytida
Endemic molluscs of New Zealand
Taxa named by Arthur William Baden Powell